Hubertus Johannes Antoinetta (Huub) Bertens (born 24 May 1960) is a Dutch professional bridge player previously from Tilburg, Netherlands, now living in Bend, Oregon (U.S.). Bertens has won numerous national and some international tournaments including the Cavendish Invitational, NEC Cup, the Yeh Brothers Cup, the European Open Team Championships. In world championships for national teams, he earned a Bronze medal in 2007 and played on the Dutch teams that finished 5th to 8th (quarterfinalists) in 2008 and 2009.

His regular partners in the Netherlands included Ton Bakkeren and Berry Westra. Married to Jeanne van den Meiracker, he has one son and one daughter.

Bertens and Curtis Cheek have established a partnership that represented the United States in the SportAccord World Mind Games at Beijing in December 2014.

Controversy
On 31 January 2021, following an investigation into the alleged use of illicit knowledge of deals he was playing in an Invitational Online Bridge Tournament from 30 May 2020 to 3 June 2020, the United States Bridge Federation announced that with immediate effect Bertens is:
 Barred from membership in the USBF until January 1, 2028, at which time he may reapply for membership in the USBF;
 On probation for a three-year period commencing on the date, if any, that he is re-admitted as a member of the USBF; and
 Barred for life from serving on the Board of Directors of the USBF.

Dutch championships

Bertens has won the following Dutch Championships:
1986-1987	Champion MK foursome
1999-2000	Champion MK foursome
2001	        NK Mixed foursome
2001-2002	Champion MK foursome
2003-2004	Champion MK foursome
2004-2005	Champion MK foursome
2006-2007	Champion MK foursome
2007-2008	MK Champion Pairs
2009-2010	Champion MK foursome
2010	        NK Mixed foursome

Runner up in the Champion MK foursome in 1987, 1997, 1998, 1999, 2009 and 2011. Bertens won the Transfer Race, a yearly individual ranking of the best Dutch player, from 2006 to 2009 and in 2011.

International results

Bertens has played on Netherlands  in world championship tournaments 2000, 2005, 2007, 2008, and 2009. In odd years (Bermuda Bowl) that implies a top-six rank in the preceding European Bridge League open teams championship.

2005: 1st place, European Open in Tenerife 
2006: 1st place (pairs), Cavendish Invitational in Las Vegas with Ton Bakkeren 
2006: 1st place, Patton Pinkster Tournament at it Onstein with Ton Bakkeren, Vincent Ramondt and Berry Westra
2007: 1st place, NEC Cup in Yokohama
2007: 1st place, White House Tournament in Amsterdam
2007: Bronze medal (Netherlands), World national teams (Bermuda Bowl)
2008: 5th place (Netherlands), national teams at the first World Mind Sports Games
2009: 1st place, Yeh Bros Cup in Australia with Ton Bakkeren, Sjoert Brink and Bas Drijver
2009: 5th place (Netherlands), World Teams Championships (Bermuda Bowl)
2011: Quarter final ('t Onstein) World Transnational Teams Championships
2020: 1st place, USBF Invitational #1

See also
 Cheating in bridge

References

External links
 
 

1960 births
Dutch contract bridge players
Bermuda Bowl players
Dutch expatriate sportspeople in the United States
Sportspeople from Tilburg
Living people
Place of birth missing (living people)